Too Fat Too Furious is a 2005 Dutch action comedy film. It is a remake of the Danish film Old Men in New Cars and received a Golden Film for 100,000 visitors.

Plot
Bennie, a clumsy criminal who's touchy about his weight, teams up with his adoptive father's biological (serial killer) son, his employees who in his absence turned his snack-bar into a quiche bakery, a suicidal manic-depressive woman and a Yugoslavian who unintentionally keeps blowing things up. They need to get 300.000 Euros to get Bennie's father a new liver. Complicating matters are that Bennie is being stalked by gangsters who want him to pay back a debt, the employees are more interested in cooking than in criminality, nobody can communicate with the Yugoslavian, the adoptive and biological son don't get along, and everything that can go wrong does go wrong - leaving a path of damaged buildings, people and - especially - vehicles behind.

Cast
Jack Wouterse as Bennie
Kürt Rogiers as Koen Mast
Bracha van Doesburgh as Katja Wielaard
Jaak Van Assche as Johan Mast
Johnny de Mol as Peter
Cas Jansen as Martin

External links

2005 films
2005 action comedy films
2000s Dutch-language films
Dutch action comedy films
Dutch crime comedy films
Films set in Rotterdam
2000s crime comedy films
2005 comedy films